The Meritorious Conduct Medal was a Rhodesian military decoration for brave and gallant conduct.

Institution
The award was instituted in 1970 by Presidential Warrant, the first awards being made the same year. The last awards were made in December 1979.

Medal
The medal was a medal whose obverse was identical to the relief portrait of Cecil Rhodes on the Rhodesian General Service Medal but struck in bronze rather than cupro-nickel, with a blank reverse. The ribbon was purple. The medal was impressed in small capitals with the recipient's name on the rim, and was awarded with a case of issue and miniature medal for wear.

Recipients
A total of 93 awards of the Meritorious Conduct Medal were made, thirteen posthumously. Notable recipients included 
 The city of Umtali (now Mutare).
 The crew members of Air Rhodesia Flight 825.
 A police officer and three NCOs from the Rhodesian SAS killed when the explosive device they were transporting blew up prematurely. 
 John M Harvey British South Africa Police

Recipients are entitled to the post-nominal letters M.C.M.

Zimbabwe
The Meritorious Conduct Medal was abolished in September 1981. Its status as the most junior of the Republic of Zimbabwe's awards for gallantry was taken by the Bronze Cross of Zimbabwe, which is also awarded to civilians and members of the Zimbabwean armed forces and police officers, and has an identical plain purple ribbon.

Notes

References
Saffery, D., 2006. The Rhodesia Medal Roll, Jeppestown Press, United Kingdom.

External links
Orders, Medals and Decorations of Zimbabwe

Military awards and decorations of Rhodesia
1981 disestablishments in Zimbabwe
1970 establishments in Rhodesia
Awards established in 1970